is the fifth single by the Hello! Project unit Buono!. The title song is used for the first ending theme of Shugo Chara!! Doki—.

The single was released on November 12, 2008 in Japan under the Pony Canyon label in two different versions; the regular edition only included a CD while the limited edition also included a DVD.

The Single V DVD of the single was released on December 3, 2008.

Track listing

CD 
 
 
 "Rottara Rottara (Instrumental)"
 "My Love (Instrumental)"

References

External links 
 Rottara Rottara entry on the Hello! Project official website 

2008 singles
Buono! songs
Song recordings produced by Tsunku
2008 songs
Pony Canyon singles
Song articles with missing songwriters